Gorripudi is situated in Kakinada district in Kakinada, in Andhra Pradesh State.

References

Villages in Kakinada district